City National Bank was a regional bank headquartered in Newark, New Jersey with four branches in the New York metropolitan area.   According to the June 2011 issue of Black Enterprise magazine, it was the seventh largest African-American owned and operated commercial bank in the United States.

As of January 2018, the bank had 3 branches, down from a peak of 9 in 2009: 2 in New Jersey and 1 in Harlem.

On Friday, November 1, 2019, City National Bank of New Jersey was closed by the Office of the Comptroller of the Currency. The FDIC was named receiver. Industrial Bank, a similar Black-owned bank headquartered in Washington D.C., acquired all deposit accounts and essentially all assets.

References

External links 

Companies based in Newark, New Jersey
Banks established in 1972
Banks disestablished in 2019
Banks based in New Jersey
Bank failures in the United States
Defunct banks of the United States
Black-owned companies of the United States